Galinsoga mandonii is a South American species of flowering plant in the family Asteraceae. It has been found in Peru, Bolivia, and far northwestern Argentina.

Description
Each head has 3-9 white or dark purple ray flowers surrounding about 5-40 yellow or purple disc flowers.

References

mandonii
Flora of South America
Plants described in 1866